This is a list of notable people associated with Baylor University in Waco, Texas, United States. To be included in this list, a person must have their own, existing Wikipedia article. The list includes notable alumni, faculty, and former students.

Alumni

Academics

 William Bennett Bizzell, former President of the University of Oklahoma and former President of Texas A&M University
 Barbara H. Bowman, geneticist and former professor at the University of Texas Medical Branch in Galveston and University of Texas Health Science Center
 Gilberto Freyre, Brazilian sociologist, cultural anthropologist and historian
 Edwin Gaustad, historian of religion in America
 Guy Benton Johnson, Sociologist and cultural anthropologist. He was a distinguished student of black culture in the rural South and a pioneer advocate of racial equality
 Jo Jorgensen, Clemson University lecturer in psychology and Libertarian Party candidate for President in 2020, VP in 1996
 Glenn McGee, American professor of medicine, philosophy, law and public health
 Judy Jolley Mohraz, 9th president of Goucher College, women's history professor, and philanthropist
 Royce Money, former President of Abilene Christian University
 Mark W. Muesse, philosopher and professor emeritus at Rhodes College
 Olin Clyde Robison, former President of Middlebury College
 Lawrence Sullivan Ross, former President of Texas A&M University and Governor of Texas
 Beck A. Taylor, president of Samford University
 Dixon Wecter (BA, 1925), Margaret Byrne Professor of United States History at the University of California, Berkeley.
 Dallas Willard, philosopher and professor at the University of Southern California

The arts

 H. Parrott Bacot, art historian
 Nancy Barrett, American actress, best known for her roles in the soap opera Dark Shadows
 Crystal Bernard, singer & actress who starred in the television series Wings
 Marc Burckhardt, artist and award-winning illustrator
 Carole Cook, actress, Broadway and film
 Elizabeth A. Davis, Tony Award-nominated actress
 Jim Dickinson, record producer, singer and pianist
 Phil Driscoll, Grammy-winning singer/trumpet player
 Rodger Dean Duncan, author and business consultant
 Jeff Dunham, award-winning ventriloquist and comedian
 Robert Fulghum, best-selling author, philosopher
 Chip Gaines, television personality, entrepreneur, and author; television series Fixer Upper and Magnolia Market
 Joanna Gaines, television personality, entrepreneur, and author; television series Fixer Upper and Magnolia Market
 Bruce Greer, award-winning composer
 Shaun Groves, contemporary Christian musician, singer, songwriter 
 Derek Haas, author/screenwriter
 Jack Hamm, author of acclaimed art books, cartoonist
 John Lee Hancock, director of The Alamo; producer of My Dog Skip
 Robin Hardy, author of numerous books including The Annals of Lystra: Chataine's Guardian
 Thomas Harris, best-selling author of Silence of the Lambs
 Mark Hayes, Christian music vocal and instrumental arranger
 Jackson Hurst, actor, American television series Drop Dead Diva and Walking Tall 3
 Brett James, country music singer and songwriter
 Julie Kenner, author and former lawyer
 Kara Killmer, actress, Chicago Fire (TV series)
 Angela Kinsey (BA, 1993); actress, podcaster, and television panelist
 Clancy Martin, novelist and philosopher
 Erin McCarley, songwriter-musician
 Brooklyn and Bailey McKnight, actresses and YouTube personalities
 Austin Miller, actor, dancer, and singer on Grease: You're The One That I Want
 Jay Hunter Morris, operatic tenor
 Willie Nelson, country music star
 Eddie Noack, country music singer and songwriter
 Grady Nutt, pastor, humorist and television personality; regular on Hee Haw (1979–1983)
 David Phelps, tenor for the Gaither Vocal Band
 Derek Phillips, actor
 Alfred Reed, composer and conductor
 Kevin Reynolds, film director
 Maddy Rosenberg, artist
 Gretchen Rossi, TV personality, The Real Housewives of Orange County
 Paul Smith, singer/songwriter, member of The Imperials
 Suzy Spencer, true-crime writer and novelist
 Robert Sterling, songwriter, produce, arranger
 Steven Stucky, Pulitzer Prize winner for music
 David Sullivan, film and television actor
 Allison Tolman, actress
 Jennifer Vasquez, actress and contestant on season six of Big Brother
 Peter Weber, television personality, pilot, and author; television series The Bachelor (TV series) and The Bachelorette (TV Series) The Penland Era: Bachelorette Contestant Peter Weber (Pilot Pete) and Being a Great Guy
 Allen Wier, writer
 Noble Willingham, television and film actor
 Roxanne Wilson, finalist on season five of The Apprentice
 Stephanie Young, voice actress, singer, songwriter
 Man-Ching Donald Yu, composer

Business

 Joe Allbritton, founder and owner of Allbritton Communications Company, the parent company of Politico
 Paul L. Foster, Chairman of the board of Western Refining
 Thomas W. Horton, Lead Director of General Electric's board of directors
 Mark Hurd, CEO and board of directors member of Oracle Corporation
 Michael S. Hyatt, former CEO of Thomas Nelson Publishers, New York Times best-selling author, and founder of Michael Hyatt & Company, an Inc. 5000 fastest growing company for 2017, 2018, and 2019
 Gary Keller, Co-founder and Chairman of Keller Williams Realty International
 Rebecca Mark, former head of Enron International
 Drayton McLane, Chairman of the McLane Group and former owner of the Houston Astros
 Bob J. Perry, founder of Perry Homes
 Marjorie Scardino; CEO of Pearson, a major media group; former CEO of the Economist Group; also a non-executive director of Nokia Corporation
 Bob R. Simpson, co-founder, Chairman, and CEO of XTO Energy and co-owner of the Texas Rangers
 Allen Stanford, former Chairman of Stanford Financial Group
 A. Latham Staples, President & CEO of EXUSMED, Inc. and Chairman of Empowering Spirits Foundation
 Bill Townsend, Internet entrepreneur and founder of the Web search engine Lycos, Inc.

Law

 Charles Barrow, Former Justice to the Texas Supreme Court and a Dean of Baylor Law School 
 Leonard E. Davis, United States District Judge for the Eastern District of Texas
 Jennifer Walker Elrod, Judge, United States Court of Appeals for the Fifth Circuit 
 Sidney A. Fitzwater, Chief United Federal District Judge for the Northern District of Texas
 A. J. Folley, Justice of the Texas Supreme Court
 James Rodney Gilstrap, United States District Judge for the Eastern District of Texas 
 James E. Kinkeade, United States Federal Judge for Northern District of Texas
 Priscilla Owen, Judge, United States Court of Appeals for the Fifth circuit, possible nominee to Supreme Court 
 Ryan Patrick, former Judge, 177th District Court, former United States Attorney for the Southern District of Texas
 Thomas R. Phillips, former Chief Justice of the Texas Supreme Court 
 Tom Price (JD), judge of the Texas Court of Criminal Appeals, 1997–2015; judge of the Texas 282nd Court, 1987–1997
 Walter Scott Smith Jr., Chief United States Federal Judge for the Western District of Texas
 William Steger, long-serving United States Federal judge for the Eastern District of Texas, ran unsuccessfully for Texas governor in 1960 and United States House of Representatives in 1962 
 T. John Ward, former United States Federal Judge for the Eastern District of Texas 
 Don Willett, United States Circuit Judge of the United States Court of Appeals for the Fifth Circuit

Media

 Richelle Carey, Al Jazeera America news anchor
 Deb Carson, Fox Sports Radio national sports anchor & co-host
 Beth Haller, journalism professor, Fulbright scholar
 Robert Heard, Reporter and journalist for the Associated Press
 Candice Millard, former National Geographic editor & New York Times Best Sellers author
 Trey Wingo, co-host of ESPN's SportsCenter

Military

 Clarence R. Autery (BA and LL B, 1957), Air Force general
 O. L. Bodenhamer (BA, 1914; LL D (hon), 1930); Army officer during World War I, 12th national commander of The American Legion from 1929 to 1930
 John R. Kane (BA, 1928); Army Air Forces Medal of Honor recipient, led bombardment aircraft in mass low-level attack against Ploesti oil refineries in 1943
 Jack Lummus; professional football player with the New York Giants, Marine Corps Medal of Honor recipient killed in action at the Battle of Iwo Jima in 1945
 Charles C. Pixley (MS), 34th surgeon general of the Army from 1977 to 1981
 Gale Pollock (MHA, 1987), deputy surgeon general of the Army from 2006 to 2007

Politics

 James B. Adams, Texas legislator, and former Director of the Federal Bureau of Investigation 
 Colin Allred, U.S. Representative from Texas's 32nd congressional district (2019–present)
 Kip Averitt, former Texas State Senator
 Charlotte Beers, American businesswoman and former U.S. Under Secretary of State (2001–2003) (attended; did not graduate) 
 Charles T. Bernard, Arkansas Republican state chairman, 1971–1973; Republican candidate for United States Senate in 1968; farmer and businessman
 Bob Bullock, Lieutenant Governor of Texas, Texas Comptroller of Public Accounts, Texas Secretary of State, Texas State Representative 
 Joseph Cao, U.S. Representative from Louisiana's 2nd congressional district (2009–11), and the first Vietnamese-American to serve in Congress 
 Brad Carson, U.S. Representative from Oklahoma's 2nd congressional district (2001–2005) 
 Sam Houston Clinton, former Texas Court of Criminal Appeals Judge.  Lawyer represented both atheist leader Madalyn Murray O'Hair and Jack Ruby, the man who shot and killed presidential assassin Lee Harvey Oswald 
 Tom Connally, U.S. Senator from Texas (1929–1953) 
 Louie Gohmert, U.S. Representative from Texas's 1st congressional district 
 Bill Daniel, Former Governor of Guam and Democratic member of the Texas House of Representatives 
 Price Daniel, served from 1957–1963 
 Price Daniel Jr., Speaker of the Texas House of Representatives (1973–1975)
 John E. Davis (BBA, 1982), Republican member of the Texas House of Representatives from Houston since 1999
 Craig Eiland, Departing state Representative and former Speaker pro Tempore of the Texas House of Representatives  
 James Walter Elder, U.S. Representative from Louisiana's 5th congressional district 
 Trey Gowdy, U.S. Representative from South Carolina's 4th congressional district 
 Philip Gunn (BBA, 1985), Speaker of the House Mississippi (current), first Republican speaker of the House in 136 years.
 Sam B. Hall, U.S. Representative from Texas's 1st congressional district (1976–1985) 
 Kelly Hancock, Republican Texas State Senator for District 9
 Phil Hardberger, former mayor of San Antonio 
 Temple Lea Houston, son of Sam Houston, District Attorney, and state legislator 
 Andrew J. Houston, U.S. Senator from Texas (1941); perennial candidate, and son of Texas statesman Sam Houston 
 Ernest Istook, U.S. Representative from Oklahoma's 5th congressional district (1993–2007) 
 Leon Jaworski, special prosecutor during the Watergate Scandal and one of the first partners of the major international law firm Fulbright & Jaworski 
 Jeff Leach (BA), state representative from District 67 in the Texas House of Representatives since 2013 
 Jim Mattox, U.S. House of Representatives from Texas's 5th district (January 3, 1977 – January 3, 1983), Member of the Texas House of Representatives from District 33 (East Dallas), 47th Attorney General of Texas In office January 18, 1983 – January 15, 1991
 Julie Myers (BA, 1991), former Assistant Secretary of Homeland Security for U.S. Immigration and Customs Enforcement 
 Pat Morris Neff, served from 1921–1925 (later served as President of Baylor from 1932 to 1947) 
 Lyndon Lowell Olson Jr., former United States Ambassador to Sweden and Vice Chairman of U.S. Advisory Commission on Public Diplomacy  
 Walter P. Paluch Jr., former Brigadier General in the United States Air Force 
 Diane Patrick, Republican member of the Texas House of Representatives from Arlington
 Rand Paul, U.S. Senator from Kentucky, and son of former Texas Congressman Ron Paul 
 Chip Pickering (MA, 1989), U.S. Representative from Mississippi's 3rd congressional district (1995–2007) 
 David Pierce, New Hampshire State Representative, 2006–2012, and New Hampshire Senator, 2012–present
 Larry Phillips (BBA), Republican member of the Texas House of Representatives since 2003 from Sherman, Texas 
 William R. Poage, U.S. Representative from Texas's 11th congressional district (1937–1979) 
 Ann Richards, served from 1991–1995
 Sul Ross, served from 1887–1891
 J. T. Rutherford, U.S. Representative from Texas's 16th congressional district (1955–1963) 
 Paul Sadler (BA), former state representative and Democratic U.S. Senate nominee in 2012 
 Ayman Safadi, Minister of Foreign and Expatriate Affairs of Jordan.
 Max Sandlin, U.S. Representative from Texas's 1st congressional district (1997–2005) 
 Scott Sanford (BBA), Member of the Texas House of Representatives from McKinney; Certified Public Accountant and Baptist pastor
 Mark M. Shelton (BS, 1979), Fort Worth pediatrician, specialist in infectious diseases, and Republican member of the Texas House of Representatives from District 97 (2009–2013); lost 2012 state Senate election in District 10 to Wendy Davis
 Max Sherman (BA, 1957), Texas State Senator (1971–1977) and president of West Texas A&M University (1977–1982) 
 William S. Sessions, former Director of the Federal Bureau of Investigation 
 David M. Sibley, Texas State Senator (1991–2002) and former mayor of Waco 
 Larry Taylor (BBA, 1982), Republican member of the Texas Senate from District 11 (2013–Present) and Texas House of Representatives from District 24 (2003–2013)
 Alan Steelman, U.S. Representative from Texas's 5th congressional district (1973–1977) 
 Abelardo L. Valdez, former United States Ambassador and Chief of Protocol of the United States 
 Jason Villalba, former state representative from District 114 in Dallas County (2013–2019); former candidate for Dallas mayor; member of the Haynes and Boone law firm in Dallas
 Kirk Watson, former Austin Mayor and current Texas State Senator 
 W. Marvin Watson, Advisor to President Lyndon Johnson and former Postmaster General
 Joseph Franklin Wilson, U.S. Representative from Texas's 5th congressional district (1947–1955)
 Gita Wirjawan, Minister of Trade of the Republic of Indonesia
 Mark White, served from 1983–1987
David Craighead, former Oklahoman representative

Religion

 George Washington Baines, Baptist clergyman in Arkansas, Louisiana, and Texas; maternal great-grandfather of Lyndon B. Johnson
 B. H. Carroll, First president of Southwestern Baptist Theological Seminary
 Russell H. Dilday, Baptist pastor (Tallowood Baptist Church and others), author, educator, former President of Southwestern Baptist Theological Seminary, one of Texas Monthly "Texas Twenty"
 James T. Draper, Jr., Pastor of First Baptist Euless (1975–1991) and president of Southern Baptist LifeWay Resources (1991–2006)
 Robert Jeffress, Pastor of First Baptist Church (Dallas, Texas) 
 Cheryl A. Kirk-Duggan, Womanist theologian and ordained elder in the CME Church
 Kyle Lake, Pastor and leader in the Emerging Church movement
 J. Frank Norris, Popular fundamentalist Baptist preacher and critic of Baylor's embracing of evolution in the 1920s
 Paul Powell, Dean of George W. Truett Theological Seminary, pastor, BGCT leader, author
 John R. Rice, Baptist evangelist and pastor and the founding editor of The Sword of the Lord, an influential fundamentalist newspaper
 Lester Roloff, fundamentalist Baptist preacher, storyteller, and author
 Kerry Shook, Pastor of The Woodlands Church (The Woodlands Texas)
 George W. Truett, Pastor First Baptist Church Dallas 1897 to 1944, president Baptist World Alliance and Southern Baptist Convention

Science and medicine

Hallie Earle, first licensed female physician in Waco, 1902 M.S. from Baylor; only female graduate of 1907 Baylor University Medical School in Dallas
 H. Bentley Glass, geneticist and columnist
 James R. Heath, chemist and the Elizabeth W. Gilloon Professor of Chemistry at the California Institute of Technology
 David Hillis, American evolutionary biologist and 1999 MacArthur Fellow
 Robert W. McCollum, virologist who made important discoveries regarding polio and hepatitis
 Rod Rohrich, internationally renown plastic surgeon and Chairman of the Department of Plastic Surgery at The University of Texas Southwestern Medical Center at Dallas
 Ada-Rhodes Short, Roboticist, professor, and trans and LGBTQ rights activist
 Norman Shumway, pioneering heart surgeon at Stanford University
 John Stapp, Physician and physicist who, among other things, studied the effects of acceleration and deceleration forces on humans
 Gordon K. Teal, worked in early efforts to improve transistors

Athletics

Badminton

 Tan Joe Hok, legendary Indonesian badminton player

Baseball

 Ken Patterson, Pitcher, Chicago White Sox, Chicago Cubs, Los Angeles Angels (MLB); currently a pitching coach specialist for the Angels 
 Pat Combs, Pitcher, first round draft pick for the Philadelphia Phillies, played for the Phillies from 1989 to 1992 
 Jason Jennings, Pitcher, Texas Rangers of Major League Baseball (MLB) 
 Ted Lyons, Pitcher, Chicago White Sox, 1923–1946, member of the Major League Baseball Hall of Fame 
 Max Muncy, Outfielder, 2012 5th round draft pick by the Oakland Athletics; now with the Los Angeles Dodgers 
 David Murphy, Outfielder, 2003 1st round draft pick by the Boston Red Sox; now with the Texas Rangers 
 Scott Ruffcorn, Pitcher, Chicago White Sox, Philadelphia Phillies (MLB) 
 Kelly Shoppach, Catcher, New York Mets (MLB) 
 Bob Simpson, owner of the Texas Rangers and co-founder of XTO Energy 
 Shawn Tolleson, Pitcher, Los Angeles Dodgers (MLB) 
 Lee Tunnell, Pitcher, 1982–1989, for the Pittsburgh Pirates, St. Louis Cardinals, and Minnesota Twins 
 Kip Wells, Pitcher, In MLB since 1999 and most recently for the San Diego Padres in 2012

Men's basketball

 Quincy Acy, power forward for the New York Knicks 
 Carroll Dawson, former assistant coach and general manager for the Houston Rockets 1980–2007
 LaceDarius Dunn, basketball player in the Israeli National League
 Melvin Hunt, assistant coach for the Dallas Mavericks and former interim head coach of the Denver Nuggets 
 Pierre Jackson, basketball player
 Curtis Jerrells, basketball player for Hapoel Jerusalem of the Israeli Premier League
 Vinnie Johnson, former player for the Detroit Pistons (1979–1992); nicknamed "The Microwave" for being able to come off the bench heated up and ready to play.  Johnson had his #15 Jersey retired by the Pistons  
 Perry Jones III, forward for the Oklahoma City Thunder 
 Manu Lecomte (born 1995), basketball player in the Israeli Basketball Premier League
 Dennis Lindsey, General Manager for the Utah Jazz, former Baylor guard (1988–1992)
 Darryl Middleton, professional player for many European teams (won the 2002 Euroleague Cup) 
 Quincy Miller, small forward for the Denver Nuggets 
 Johnathan Motley, first player in franchise history to sign a two-way contract with the Dallas Mavericks. He is a forward for the Dallas Mavericks 
 Royce O'Neale, forward for the Utah Jazz 
 Taurean Prince, was selected with the 12th overall pick in the 2016 NBA draft, He is a forward for the Cleveland Cavaliers
 Jackie Robinson, won a gold medal as a guard for the 1948 U.S. Olympic basketball team in London 
 Brian Skinner, forward for the Los Angeles Clippers 
 Terry Teagle, shooting guard for Rockets, Lakers, & Warriors from 1982–1993, the 16th overall pick (Rockets) in the 1982 NBA draft
 Ekpe Udoh, forward for the Beijing Royal Fighters 
 Micheal Williams, former point guard for the Detroit Pistons, Phoenix Suns, Charlotte Hornets, Indiana Pacers, Minnesota Timberwolves, and Toronto Raptors.
 David Wesley, a 16-year NBA veteran and former guard with the Cleveland Cavaliers, Houston Rockets, Charlotte Hornets, Boston Celtics, and New Jersey Nets.  He is the current television color analyst for the New Orleans Pelicans

Women's basketball

 Jody Conradt, Legendary women's basketball coach at the University of Texas 
 Lauren Cox, Forward for the Indiana Fever 
 Brittney Griner, WNBA first-round draft pick (Phoenix 2013)
 Sonja Hogg, Head women's basketball coach at Louisiana Tech and Baylor 
 Sheila Lambert, Drafted by the Charlotte Sting in the First Round (No. 7 overall) of the 2002 WNBA Draft
 Bernice Mosby, WNBA first-round draft pick (Washington 2007) 
 Kim Mulkey, Lady Bear basketball coach. She is the first person in NCAA history to win a basketball national championship as a player, assistant coach, and head coach.  Has won 2 NCAA Championships (2005, 2012) as head coach at Baylor and has won the Big 12 regular season championship 9 times (2005, 2011–2018)
 Sophia Young, All-Star forward and 2006 first-round draft pick for the San Antonio Silver Stars of the WNBA

Football

 Walter Abercrombie, NFL running back for the Pittsburgh Steelers and Philadelphia Eagles
 Riley Biggs, American football center
 Matt Bryant, NFL placekicker for the Atlanta Falcons 
 Cody Carlson, NFL quarterback taken in the 3rd round of the 1987 NFL Draft for the Houston Oilers (1988–1994)
 Nakia Codie, NFL defensive back
 Ray Crockett, NFL cornerback drafted by the Detroit Lions in 1989, won two (2) Super Bowl rings with the Denver Broncos, BU Hall of Fame Class of 2008
 Cotton Davidson, Played and coached at Baylor, quarterback in the NFL and AFL
 Paul Dickson, NFL defensive and offensive lineman for the Minnesota Vikings and the Dallas Cowboys
 Santana Dotson, Tampa Bay Buccaneers defensive lineman, 1992 NFL Defensive Rookie of the Year, also played for the Green Bay Packers and Washington Redskins (1992–2002) 
 L.G. Dupre, running back for the Baltimore Colts and the Dallas Cowboys
 Thomas Everett, NFL defensive back with the Pittsburgh Steelers, Dallas Cowboys, and Tampa Bay Buccaneers (1987–1995) 
 James Francis, NFL linebacker for the Cincinnati Bengals and Washington Redskins (1990–1999)
 Ron Francis, Cornerback for the Dallas Cowboys and the New England Patriots
 Malcolm Frank, Canadian Football League defensive back 
 Hayden Fry, NCAA Division I-A coach (1962–1998), inducted into the College Football Hall of Fame in 2003. 
 Terrance Ganaway, Running back for the St. Louis Rams
 Kelvin Garmon, Offensive guard for the Dallas Cowboys, San Diego Chargers and the Cleveland Browns
 Lester Gatewood, NFL center for the Green Bay Packers 
 Dennis Gentry, NFL running back (1982–1992), selected in the 4th round of the 1982 NFL Draft by the Chicago Bears 
 David Gettis, 2010 NFL Draft 198th overall pick by the Carolina Panthers 
 Bill Glass, Round 1 draft pick and defensive tackle with the Detroit Lions (1958–1961) and the Cleveland Browns (1962–1968) 
 Josh Gordon, Wide receiver, Drafted in the second round of the 2012 supplemental draft by the Cleveland Browns 
 Robert Griffin III, Heisman Trophy winning (2011) Baylor quarterback; 2012 NFL Draft 2nd overall draft pick by the Washington Redskins 
 Greg Hawthorne, NFL running back with the Pittsburgh Steelers and New England Patriots 
 Heath Herring (attended), football player and wrestler; retired mixed martial artist fighter, formerly for the Ultimate Fighting Championship
 Darrell Hogan, NFL player for the Pittsburgh Steelers
 Jeff Ireland, Kicker at Baylor and general manager of the Miami Dolphins
 Joe Jackson, American football player
 Clay Johnston, Linebacker for the Los Angeles Rams
 George Koch, NFL and AAFC player
 Khari Long, Defensive end for the Chicago Bears 
 James Lynch, Defensive tackle for the Minnesota Vikings
 Gerald McNeil, "The Ice Cube",  NFL and USFL wide receiver that played in the 1980s 
 Fred Miller, Offensive tackle for the St. Louis Rams (1996–1999), Tennessee Titans (2000–2004), and the Chicago Bears (2005–2008) 
 Denzel Mims, Wide receiver for the New York Jets
 Mike Nelms, All-pro NFL and CFL defensive back 
 J. W. Pender, University of North Texas head coach (1913–1914) 
 Luke Prestridge, Former all-pro NFL punter with the Denver Broncos
 Robert Quiroga, Arena Football League player
 John B. Reid, University of North Texas head coach
 Bravvion Roy, Defensive tackle for the Carolina Panthers
 Lloyd Russell, University of North Texas head coach (1942); Baylor Bears baseball head coach (1940–1941, 1958–1961) 
 Daniel Sepulveda, Punter for Pittsburgh Steelers; two time Ray Guy Award winner 
 Del Shofner, Wide receiver for L.A. Rams (1957–1960), New York Giants (1961–1967); five-time All-Pro and Pro Bowler 
 Mike Singletary, Linebacker for the Chicago Bears (1981–1992); head coach of the San Francisco 49ers (2008–2010); assistant head coach for the Minnesota Vikings, inducted into the Pro Football Hall of Fame in 1998 
 Jack Sisco, University of North Texas head coach 
 Jason Smith, Offensive tackle, 2nd overall draft pick by the St. Louis Rams in 2009 NFL Draft 
 Jack Steadman, Former chairman, vice president, president and general manager for the Kansas City Chiefs 
 Phil Taylor, Defensive tackle for the Cleveland Browns, 21st overall draft pick in 2011 NFL Draft 
 Don Trull, All American quarterback at Baylor; played six seasons with the AFL Houston Oilers (1964–1969)  
 J. D. Walton, Offensive center for the Denver Broncos 
 Danny Watkins, Offensive tackle for the Philadelphia Eagles, 23rd overall draft pick in 2011 NFL Draft 
 John Westbrook, first African American to play football in the Southwest Conference
 Robert Williams, Cornerback for the Dallas Cowboys, Phoenix Cardinals and the Kansas City Chiefs
 Terrance Williams, Wide receiver, 2013 NFL Draft 74th overall draft pick by the Dallas Cowboys 
 Kendall Wright, Wide receiver for the Tennessee Titans, 20th overall draft pick in 2012 NFL Draft 
 Bob Woodruff, Former head coach at the University of Florida and former athletic director of the University of Tennessee

Golf

 Jason Hill, golfer
 Jimmy Walker, PGA Tour PGA Championship winner

Gymnastics

 Kiara Nowlin

Tennis

 Benjamin Becker, German professional player (defeated Andre Agassi in Agassi's final match in the 2006 U.S. Open)
 Benedikt Dorsch, German professional player
 John Peers, Australian professional player

Track and field

 Trayvon Bromell, The first junior to surpass the 10-second barrier for the 100 meters.  He secured a spot on the 2016 U.S. Olympic team
 Michael Johnson, Winner of five Olympic gold medals and nine-time world champion 
 KC Lightfoot, Placed fourth in the pole vault at the 2020 Summer Olympics. 
 Jeremy Wariner, Winner of gold medals at the 2004 Summer Olympics in Athens, Greece for the individual 400 meter and the 4 × 400 meter 
 Darold Williamson, Winner of a gold medal at the 2004 Summer Olympics in Athens, Greece  in the 4 × 400 meter 
 Reggie Witherspoon, Winner of a gold medal at the 2008 Summer Olympics in Beijing for the 4 × 400 meter along with teammate Jeremy Wariner

Volleyball

 Laura Daniela Lloreda, Mexican/Puerto Rican player

Faculty

Administration

 Reddin Andrews, President of Baylor University from 1885 to 1886
 George Washington Baines, Maternal great-grandfather of U.S. President Lyndon Baines Johnson, served briefly as natural science professor and president of Baylor University at its first location in Independence, Texas
 Samuel Palmer Brooks, President of Baylor University from 1902 to 1931
 Rufus Columbus Burleson, President of Baylor University from 1851 to 1861, and again from 1886 to 1897
 Oscar Henry Cooper, President of Baylor University from 1899 to 1902, and of Simmons College, now known as Hardin–Simmons University from 1902 to 1909
 David E. Garland, Interim president of Baylor University 2008 to 2010 and 2016, and Dean of George W. Truett Theological Seminary at Baylor University 2007 to 2016
 Henry Lee Graves, President of Baylor University from 1846 to 1851
 John M. Lilley, President of the University of Nevada, Reno from 2001 to 2005 and Baylor University from 2006 to 2008
 Abner Vernon McCall, President of Baylor University from 1961 to 1981
 Herbert H. Reynolds, President of Baylor University from 1981 to 1995
 Ken Starr, Special Counsel during the Whitewater controversy and later president of Baylor
 Robert B. Sloan, President of Baylor University from 1995 to 2005, and of Houston Baptist University from 2006 to the present
 William D. Underwood, Interim president of Baylor University 2005 to 2006, and of Mercer University 2006 to present
 William R. White, President of Hardin–Simmons University from 1940 to 1943, and of Baylor University from 1948 to 1961

Coaches

 Scott Drew, Men's basketball coach
 Clyde Hart, Former head track coach, currently director of track and field
 Sonja Hogg, Former head woman's basketball coach at Louisiana Tech University and at Baylor University
 Glenn Moore, Softball coach, played both football and baseball in college and softball with "The King and His Court"
 Kim Mulkey, Lady Bear basketball coach, college player at the Louisiana Tech University and on the US Olympic Team
 Grant Teaff, Former football head coach (1972–1992), member of the College Football Hall of Fame and executive director of the American Football Coaches Association
 Randy Waldrum, Founded the Baylor University women's soccer program, and went 46–14–3 from 1996 to 1998. Current head coach of the University of Notre Dame's women's soccer team
 George Woodruff, Former Baylor football coach

Biology

 Maria Elena Bottazzi, Distinguished Professor of Biology
 Lula Pace (1868–1925), First female professor at Baylor with a PhD

Economics

 Earl Grinols, Distinguished Professor of Economics, notable works include contributions to the study of the economic effect of gambling and casinos
 David VanHoose, Herman W. Lay Professor of Private Enterprise. He has written text books and papers used in the field of economics. Areas of focus are international economics, monetary economics, macroeconomics, and banking

Engineering

 W. Mack Grady, Professor of Electrical and Computer Engineering
 Robert J. Marks II, Distinguished Professor of Electrical and Computer Engineering, notable work in application of artificial neural networks, brachytherapy, wireless communication, detection theory, and Fourier analysis; a proponent of intelligent design and is featured in the documentary Expelled: No Intelligence Allowed

English

 Greg Garrett, Professor of English, winner of the Pirate's Alley William Faulkner Prize for Fiction, and author of several books

History

 Beth Allison Barr, James Vardaman Endowed Professor of History
 Philip Jenkins, Distinguished Professor of History and Co-Director of the Program on Historical Studies of Religion

Mathematics

 David Arnold, Ralph and Jean Storm Professor of Mathematics
 Vivienne Malone-Mayes, First African-American Mathematics professor at Baylor
 Dorina Mitrea, Professor and Department Chair of Mathematics

Philosophy

 Francis J. Beckwith, Associate Professor and Christian philosopher
 Jean Bethke Elshtain, Visiting Distinguished Professor of Religion and Public Life
 C. Stephen Evans, University Professor of Philosophy and Humanities
 Thomas S. Hibbs, Dean of the Honors College and Distinguished Professor of Philosophy
 Jonathan Kvanvig, Distinguished Professor of Philosophy, Christian philosopher, specialist in Epistemology and Philosophy of Religion
 Robert Campbell Roberts, Distinguished Professor of Ethics
 Alexander Pruss, philosopher, mathematician and the co-director of graduate studies in philosophy.

Physics

 Gerald B. Cleaver, Theoretical physicist, with research in string theory, quantum gravity, and early universe cosmology
 Anzhong Wang, Theoretical physicist, specialized in gravitation, cosmology and astroparticle physics; currently working on cosmology in string/M theory and the Hořava-Lifshitz gravity
 Bennie Ward, Theoretical particle physicist, Fellow of the American Physical Society and is currently Co-Editor-in-Chief of The Open Nuclear and Particle Physics Journal

Religion

 Carlos Cardoza-Orlandi, Frederick E. Roach Chair in World Christianity
 Edward R. Dalglish, Biblical scholar and professor of Old Testament
 Philip Jenkins, Director of Program for Historical Studies of Religion
 Ralph C. Wood, University professor and author of The Gospel According to Tolkien

School of Music

 Storm Bull, Musician, composer and educator, Professor Emeritus at the College of Music, University of Colorado at Boulder

Social sciences

 Marc H. Ellis, Controversial author of numerous articles and books on Israel and Jewish affairs
 Jay Hein, Director of the Program on Faith & Generosity and former Director of the White House Office of Faith-Based and Community Initiatives
 Jerry Pattengale, Distinguished Senior Fellow at the Baylor Institute for Studies of Religion and Director of the Green Scholars Initiative
 Rodney Stark, Advocate of the application of rational choice theory in the sociology of religion

Truett Seminary

 Jimmy Dorrell, Professor of Missions, author of Trolls and Truth
 Roger E. Olson, Professor of Theology, author of The Story of Christian Theology Twenty Centuries of Tradition & Reform

References

Baylor